The 1975 Noritake Porcelainmakers season was the maiden season of the franchise in the Philippine Basketball Association (PBA).

Colors 
Noritake  (dark)   (light)

First Conference standings

Notable dates 
 April 9: The PBA opens with its inaugural double-header at the Araneta Coliseum, with a sellout crowd of 18,000 watching, the Noritake Porcelainmakers defeated the Carrier Weathermakers, 101-98.

Summary 
The Porcelainmakers were a steady and average team, hovering around a .500 record for almost each conference in the season. In the First Conference, Noritake almost made the playoffs with a record of 8-8 (.500), two games shy behind the Royal Tru-Orange. The team was led by all-star Rey Alcantara and imports Cisco Oliver and Billy Robinson.

In the Second Conference, they their best record of the season going 13-9 (.591), but still missed the playoffs, they finished as the 5th seed also again behind the Royal Tru-Orange.

In the All-Philippine Championship Conference, Noritake lose their last 2 games of the season and again missed the playoffs.

Roster 

Sources:
 Edmon1974's Blog: 1975 Philippine Basketball Association (PBA) Team Rosters

See also 
 1975 PBA season

References 

Noritake Porcelainmakers